Crime Boss  is a 1972 Italian crime film directed by Alberto De Martino.

Production
Crime Boss was filmed at Incir-De Paolis Film Studios in Rome and on location in Milan, Palermo, Rome and Hamburg. Director Alberto De Martino joked about the film later, stating it was "the story of Caesar and Brutus, essentially [...] a bit like Shakespears so to speak."

Release
Crime Boss was released theatrically in Italy on 8 August 1972 where it was distributed by P.A.C. The film grossed 498,812,000 Italian lire on its domestic release.

Reception
From a retrospective review, film historian Roberto Curti praised Aristide Massaccesi's "efficient camerawork" but that the film does not "live up to its impressive opening", noting that Lucio Battistrada's screenplay "becomes cliché-ridden" and that Antonio Sabàto was "wooden as usual".

Footnotes

References

External links
 

1972 crime films
1972 films
Italian crime films
Films shot in Milan
Films shot in Rome
Films shot in Hamburg
Films directed by Alberto De Martino
Films scored by Francesco De Masi
1970s Italian films